Sinan Ramović (born 13 October 1992) is a Bosnian professional footballer who plays as a midfielder. He most recently played for Bosnian Premier League club Željezničar.

Personal life
Sinan is the cousin of popular Bosnian singer Džejla Ramović.

Honours
Željezničar 
Bosnian Cup: 2017–18

References

External links

Sinan Ramović at Sofascore

1992 births
Living people
People from Goražde
Bosnia and Herzegovina footballers
Bosnia and Herzegovina expatriate footballers
Expatriate footballers in Switzerland
Bosnia and Herzegovina expatriate sportspeople in Switzerland
First League of the Federation of Bosnia and Herzegovina players
Premier League of Bosnia and Herzegovina players
Swiss Challenge League players
FK Goražde players
NK GOŠK Gabela players
FK Velež Mostar players
FK Mladost Doboj Kakanj players
FK Željezničar Sarajevo players
FC Stade Lausanne Ouchy players
Association football midfielders